Pseudomecas pickeli is a species of beetle in the family Cerambycidae. It was described by Melzer in 1930.

References

Aerenicini
Beetles described in 1930